Necdet Niş (6 April 1937 – 11 April 2018) was a Turkish football player and manager.

References

1937 births
2018 deaths
Turkish footballers
Association football midfielders
Hacettepe S.K. footballers
Turkish football managers
Göztepe S.K. managers
Fenerbahçe football managers
Altay S.K. managers
Bursaspor managers
Sakaryaspor managers
Bakırköyspor managers
MKE Ankaragücü managers